Thompsonville may refer to a place in the United States:

 Thompsonville, Connecticut
 Thompsonville, Delaware
 Thompsonville, Illinois
 Thompsonville, Kansas
 Thompsonville, Massachusetts
 Thompsonville, Michigan
 Thompsonville, Pennsylvania
 Thompsonville, Texas (disambiguation) (2 places)
 Thompsonville, Gonzales County, Texas
 Thompsonville, Jim Hogg County, Texas